Morad Beyglu (also Romanized as Morād Beyglū; also known as Morād Peglū, Mordā Beglū, Mūrāb, and Murād Beli) is a village in Ramand-e Jonubi Rural District, Ramand District, Buin Zahra County, Qazvin Province, Iran. At the 2006 census, its population was 208, in 42 families.

References 

Populated places in Buin Zahra County